Nalliah Kumaraguruparan is a Sri Lankan Tamil accountant, politician and former provincial councillor. He is leader of the Democratic National Front.

Career
Kumaraguruparan was one of the All Ceylon Tamil Congress's (ACTC) candidates in Jaffna District at the 1989 parliamentary election but the ACTC failed to win any seats in Parliament. He contested the 1994 parliamentary election as part of an independent group in Colombo District but the group failed to win any seats in Parliament.

Kumaraguruparan was elected general-secretary of the ACTC in January 2000. He was later senior deputy president of the party.

Kumaraguruparan joined the Western People's Front (WPF) in May 2004. He contested the 2004 provincial election as one of the WPF's candidates in Colombo District but failed to get elected after coming third amongst the WPF candidates. He contested the 2006 local government election as a WPF candidate and was elected to Colombo Municipal Council. Kumaraguruparan served as general-secretary of the WPF.

Kumaraguruparan contested the 2009 provincial council election as one of the United National Front's (UNF) candidates in Colombo District and was elected to the Western Provincial Council. He contested the 2010 parliamentary election as one of the UNF's candidates in Colombo District but failed to get elected after coming tenth amongst the UNF candidates. He contested the 2014 provincial election as one of the Democratic People's Front's (DPF) candidates in Colombo District but failed to get re-elected. Shortly afterwards Kumaraguruparan fell out with the DPF leadership and was expelled from the party.

Kumaraguruparan then founded a party called Democratic National Front. He contested the 2015 parliamentary election as one of the United People's Freedom Alliance's (UPFA) candidates in Colombo District but failed to get elected after coming 19th amongst the UPFA candidates.

Electoral history

References

All Ceylon Tamil Congress politicians
Colombo municipal councillors
Democratic People's Front politicians
Living people
Members of the Western Provincial Council
People from Jaffna
Sri Lankan Hindus
Sri Lankan Tamil accountants
Sri Lankan Tamil politicians
United People's Freedom Alliance politicians
Year of birth missing (living people)